Crispiloba is a monotypic genus of flowering plants containing the single species Crispiloba disperma, native to Queensland in Australia. Crispiloba disperma is a shrub species that grows to 4 metres tall. It produces fragrant white flowers followed by purplish ovoid fruits. It occurs in rainforest in North-east Queensland at altitudes ranging from 100  to 1250 metres. 
The species was first formally described in 1917, based on plant material collected from Mount Bellenden Ker. It was originally given the name Randia disperma and subsequently transferred to the genus Crispiloba in 1984.

References

Alseuosmiaceae
Monotypic Asterales genera
Flora of Queensland